Clem Eischen (December 24, 1926 – December 7, 2020) was an American middle-distance runner. He competed in the men's 1500 metres at the 1948 Summer Olympics.

References

External links
 

1926 births
2020 deaths
Athletes (track and field) at the 1948 Summer Olympics
American male middle-distance runners
Olympic track and field athletes of the United States
Place of birth missing